The 2012 ECOWAS Games was the second biennial regional sports meeting of the Economic Community of West African States. The event was held in Accra, Ghana from the 16th of June to the 22nd of June 2012. Ghana's sports team won the most medals at the event. The 5 sports that featured in the 2012 games were athletics, wrestling, handball, volleyball and boxing. The first edition of the event was held in Nigeria in 2010. The games were sponsored by Rlg Communications, Ghana National Petroleum Corporation, Ghana Oil Company, Ghana National Petroleum Corporation, Ghallywood and Zoomlion.

Participating nations

Sports

Medal table

Calendar
The schedule of the games was as follows. The calendar is to be completed with event finals information.

Venues
Accra Sports Stadium Complex – Boxing, Handball, Volleyball, Wrestling
El-Wak Sports Stadium – Athletics

References

2012
2012 in African sport
2012 in Ghanaian sport